The following table lists Canada's census divisions by population in the 2016 Canadian census, from highest to lowest. Clicking on the province's two letter abbreviation will take you to a list of census divisions for that province with links.

List

See also

List of the largest cities and towns in Canada by area
List of the largest municipalities in Canada by population
List of the largest population centres in Canada
List of metropolitan areas in Canada
Population of Canada by province and territory
List of largest Canadian cities by census
Population of Canada by year

Notes

References

External links
 2016 census (Statistics Canada)
 2011 census (Statistics Canada)
 2006 census (Statistics Canada)

Census divisions of Canada
Demographics of Canada